Hit Parade of 1941 is a 1940 American film written by Bradford Ropes, F. Hugh Herbert and Maurice Leo and directed by John H. Auer. It was nominated for the Oscar for Best Song at the 13th Academy Awards with the song "Who Am I?", with music by Jule Styne and lyrics by Walter Bullock. Also nominated for the Oscar for Best Original Score in the same ceremony for composer Cy Feuer.

Plot
A small radio station in Brooklyn, WPX, is saved from going bankrupt by a backer (Mary Boland), who agrees to invest money for television equipment if the owner (Kenny Baker) allows her dancing daughter Annabelle (Ann Miller) to dance and sing on the screen. Due to her voice, her singing needs to be dubbed by the owner's girlfriend, Pat Abbott (Frances Langford). Problems arise when the owner starts dating Annabelle.

Cast
 Kenny Baker as David Farraday
 Frances Langford as Pat Abbott
 Hugh Herbert as Ferdinand Farraday
 Ann Miller as Annabelle
 Patsy Kelly as Judy
 Mary Boland as Emily
 Phil Silvers as Charlie Moore
 Donald MacBride as Harrison
 Franklin Pangborn as Carter
 Emory Parnell as Policeman
 Borrah Minevitch and His Harmonica Rascals
 Sterling Holloway as Elmer
 Six Hits and a Miss as Singing Group

Songs
Music by Jule Styne, lyrics by Walter Bullock
Who Am I?
Swing Low, Sweet Rhythm
The Little Old Lamp
In The Cool of the Evening
South American Ballet

References

External links
 

1941 films
1940s musical comedy films
American black-and-white films
American musical comedy films
1940s English-language films
Films about radio
Films about singers
Films about television
Films directed by John H. Auer
Films produced by Sol C. Siegel
Republic Pictures films
1941 comedy films
1940 comedy films
1940 films
Films with screenplays by F. Hugh Herbert
1940s American films